The men's K-1 5000 metres canoe sprint competition at the 2019 European Games in Minsk took place on 27 June at the Zaslavl Regatta Course.

Schedule
The schedule was as follows:

All times are Further-eastern European Time (UTC+3)

Results
As a long-distance event, it was held as a direct final.

References

Men's K-1 5000 metres